National Highway 320D, commonly referred to as NH 320D is a national highway in India. It is a secondary route of National Highway 20.  NH-320D runs in the states of Jharkhand and Odisha in India.

Route 
NH320D connects Chakradharpur, Sonua, Goelkera, Manoharpur, Jaraikela and Rourkela in the states of Jharkhand and Odisha.

Junctions  
 
  Terminal near Chakradharpur.
  near Manoharpur
  Terminal near Rourkela.

See also 
 List of National Highways in India
 List of National Highways in India by state

References

External links 

 NH 320D on OpenStreetMap

National highways in India
National Highways in Jharkhand
National Highways in Odisha